Culo e camicia is a 1981 Italian comedy film directed by Pasquale Festa Campanile, consisting in two segments, respectively starred by Enrico Montesano and Renato Pozzetto.

Cast 
Il televeggente 
 Enrico Montesano as Rick Antuono
 Daniela Poggi as Ornella
 Gianni Agus as director Annibale Panebianco
 Gino Pernice as Carletto Benedetti
 Umberto Zuanelli as Orfeo Canevari aka Geppetto 
 Ennio Antonelli as salumiere

Un uomo, un uomo e... Evviva una donna! 
 Renato Pozzetto as Renato
 Leopoldo Mastelloni as Alberto Maria
 Maria Rosaria Omaggio as Ella
 Carlo Bagno as father of Renato
 Carla Monti as mother of Renato

References

External links

1981 films
1981 comedy films
Italian comedy films
Films directed by Pasquale Festa Campanile
Adultery in films
Italian LGBT-related films
1981 LGBT-related films
Films scored by Detto Mariano
1980s Italian films